David Rumbutis (born 17 March 2000) is a Swedish gymnast. He competed in the 2020 Summer Olympics.

Personal life 
Rumbutis was born to Lithuanian father and Swedish mother.

References

External links
David Rumbutis at the International Gymnastics Federation

2000 births
Living people
Gymnasts at the 2020 Summer Olympics
Swedish male artistic gymnasts
Olympic gymnasts of Sweden
Sportspeople from Norrbotten County
Swedish people of Lithuanian descent